Sri Sulalai (1770–1837), née Riam, was the wife of Phra Phutthaloetla Naphalai, Rama II of Siam and was the mother of Nangklao, Rama III.

She was of Persian descent and her family was Muslim from the Southern part of the Kingdom. She married Prince Isarasundhorn as the second concubine and gave birth to Prince Thap (later Prince Chetsadabodin) in 1787.

In 1809, Prince Isarasundhorn was crowned as King Buddha Loetla Nabhalai. Chao Chom Manda Riam then moved to the Royal Grand Palace and presided over the royal kitchen. Prince Jessadabodindra was trusted by the king to handle various state affairs. In 1824, King Buddha Loetla Nabhalai died. According to the tradition, the throne would go to Prince Mongkut, the son of Queen Sri Suriyendra. However, the nobility instead enthroned Prince Jessadabodindra because he had served the king in Kromma Tha (Ministry of Trade and Foreign Affairs) for years and was proved to be competent to rule.

As her son was crowned, Noble consort Riam was raised to Princess Mother Sri Sulalai, thus a member of the royalty. Her son also constructed a mosque in her honor. She died in 1837.

Ancestors

References 

1770 births
1837 deaths
18th-century Chakri dynasty
19th-century Chakri dynasty
Converts to Buddhism from Islam
Thai people of Iranian descent
Sri Sulalai
Thai former Muslims
Thai princesses
Queen mothers
People from Nonthaburi province
Thai people of Malay descent